The 2019–20 Arizona Wildcats men's basketball team represented the University of Arizona during the 2019–20 NCAA Division I men's basketball season. The team was led by 11th-year head coach Sean Miller and played their home games at McKale Center in Tucson, Arizona as members of the Pac-12 Conference. They finished the season 21–11, 10–8 in Pac-12 play to finish in tie for fifth place. They received the No. 5 seed in the 2019 Pac-12 tournament, where they defeated Washington in the first round and were set to take on USC in the quarterfinals before the remainder of the Pac-12 Tournament was cancelled amid the COVID-19 pandemic.

Previous season
The Wildcats finished the 2018–19 season 17–15, 8–10 in Pac-12 play to finish in three-way tie for 6th place. They received the 9-seed in the 2019 Pac-12 tournament, where they lost to 8-seed USC in the first round, 65–78.

Offseason

2019 recruiting class
Nico Mannion, originally from Siena, Italy, was originally a part of the 2020 recruiting class, but reclassified to the 2019 class in July 2018. He verbally committed to Arizona on September 14, 2018, over Marquette. Mannion is a consensus five-star prospect out of Pinnacle HS in Phoenix, Arizona.

Christian Koloko, originally from Douala, Cameroon, was the second commitment in the Arizona class. He committed to Arizona on September 23, 2018, over California, Creighton, and Vanderbilt. He is a consensus four-star prospect out of Sierra Canyon School in Chatsworth, California.

Josh Green, originally from Sydney, New South Wales, Australia was the third commitment in the Arizona's 2019 recruiting class. He verbally committed to Arizona on October 4, 2018, over Kansas, North Carolina, Villanova, USC and UNLV. Green is a consensus five-star prospect out of IMG Academy in Bradenton, Florida. 

Zeke Nnaji, originally from Lakeville, MN was the fifth commitment in the Arizona's 2019 recruiting class. He verbally committed to Arizona on November 23, 2018, over UCLA, North Carolina, Kansas and Purdue. Nnaji is a consensus four-star prospect out of Hopkins High School in Minnetonka, Minnesota.

2020 recruiting class
Dalen Terry, originally from Phoenix, Arizona, was the first commit of the 2020 recruiting class.  He verbally committed to Arizona on July 23, 2019 over rival Arizona State, Arkansas, California, Colorado, Memphis, USC and Utah. Terry a consensus four-star prospect out of Hillcrest Prep in Phoenix, Arizona.

Bennedict Mathurin, originally from Montreal, Canada was the second commitment of the 2020 recruiting class. He verbally committed to Arizona on January 15, 2020 over Baylor & Washington State.  Mathurin was a consensus four-star prospect out of the NBA Academy Latin America.

Kerr Kriisa, originally from Tartu, Estonia, was the third commitment of the 2020 recruiting class. He verbally committed to Arizona on April 18, 2020 over BYU, Oregon & Syracuse. Kriisa a consensus four-star prospect out of BC Prienai in Prienai, Lithuania.

Daniel Batcho, originally from Chatenay-Malabry, France, was the fourth commitment in the Arizona class. He committed to Arizona on April 23, 2020, over Arizona State, Creighton, Miami & Virginia Tech. He is a consensus four-star prospect out of Centre Fédéral de Basket-ball in Paris, France.

Tibet Gorener, originally from Şişli, Turkey, was the fifth commitment in the Arizona class.  He committed to Arizona on April 28, 2020, over Nebraska, Creighton, UC Santa Barbara & UConn. He is consensus four-star out of Orange Lutheran HS in Orange, California.

Ąžuolas Tubelis, originally from Lithuania, was the sixth commitment in the Arizona class. He committed to Arizona on May 27, 2020. He is currently a four-star prospect out of Rytas Vilnius in Lithuania.

Tautvilas Tubelis, originally from Lithuania, was the seventh commitment in the Arizona class. He committed to Arizona on May 27, 2020. He is currently an unranked prospect out of Rytas Vilnius in Lithuania.

Coaching changes
In June 2019, Northern Arizona head coach Jack Murphy resigned to take the position of associate head coach on Miller's staff.

Personnel

Roster
  

 

 

 

 

Aug. 7, 2019 – Sophomore guard Brandon Williams to miss entire 2019–20 season due to a right knee injury.
Nov. 1, 2019 – Sophomore guard Devonaire Doutrive was suspended indefinitely after violating team rules.  He returned to action Nov. 14, 2019
Nov. 22, 2019 – Sophomore guard Devonaire Doutrive was dismissed after violating team rules.
Nov. 30, 2019 – Graduate forward Stone Gettings out with concussion and facial fracture in game against Penn. Made return against Arizona State on January 4, 2020.
Jan. 3, 2020 – Freshman Jordan Mains has been added to the roster as a walk-on.
Jan. 16, 2020 – RS Senior center Chase Jeter out with a back injury.

Coaching staff

Depth chart

Preseason

Red and Blue game 
The annual Red-Blue game was held at McKale Center on September 27, 2019.
Sophomore Devonaire Doutrive won the slam dunk contest, and the Blue team, led by Devonaire Doutrive, defeated the Red team, 46–32.

Preseason rankings
The Arizona Wildcats were selected fourth in the 2019–20 Pac-12 media poll. The Wildcats were ranked 21 in the AP Top 25 and ranked 17 in the Coaches polls.

Preseason awards watchlists
 Josh Green – Julius Erving Award (FR, SG)
 Chase Jeter – Kareem Abdul-Jabbar Award (RSSR, F/C)
 Nico Mannion – Naismith Trophy (FR, PG)
 Nico Mannion – Wooden Award (FR, PG)
 Zeke Nnaji − Oscar Robertson Trophy (FR, PF)

Preseason All Pac-12 teams
The Wildcats had 2 players at 2 positions selected to the preseason all Pac-12 teams.

 
First team
 Nico Mannion – FR, PG

Second team

 Josh Green – FR, SG

Schedule and results
The Wildcats opponents were finalized in the summer and dates and times will be finalized in the fall. Arizona will host opponents Chico State (exhibition game), Gonzaga, Illinois, Long Beach State, New Mexico State, Northern Arizona, Omaha, San Jose State, and South Dakota State at McKale Center in Tucson, AZ. Arizona will participate in the 2019 Wooden Legacy in Anaheim, CA with six of the following potential opponents including (College of Charleston, Pepperdine, Penn, Providence, UCF, or Wake Forest). The Wildcats will also play in a neutral-site game against St. John's at the new Chase Center in San Francisco, CA in the Naismith Memorial Hall of Fame Game. Arizona played only one true road game against Baylor at Ferrell Center in Waco, TX.

In the unbalanced 18-game Pac-12 schedule, Arizona did not play the two Rocky Mountain schools on the road (Colorado and Utah) or the two Northern California schools at home (California and Stanford).

|-
!colspan=12 style=| Exhibition

|-
!colspan=12 style=| Non-conference regular season

|-
!colspan=12 style=|  Pac-12 regular season

|-
!colspan=12 style=| Pac-12 Tournament

Rankings

*AP does not release post-NCAA Tournament rankings^Coaches did not release a Week 2 poll.

Player statistics

Awards & milestones

Season highs

Weekly awards
Zeke Nnaji
4x Pac-12 Freshman Player of the Week, (Nov. 11 & 18, Jan. 20, Feb. 17)
Malone Finalist

Nico Mannion
Wooden Legacy MVP
Wooden Legacy All-Tournament Team
 Pac-12 Freshman Player of the Week, (Dec. 2)

Chase Jeter
Wooden Legacy All-Tournament Team

Dylan Smith
Wooden Legacy All-Tournament Team

Pac-12 Conference honors
Stone Gettings
Pac-12 Men's Basketball Scholar-Athlete of the Year

Zeke Nnaji
Pac-12 Freshman Player of the Year
All-Pac-12 First Team

Nico Mannion
All-Pac-12 Second Team

See also
2019–20 Arizona Wildcats women's basketball team

References

2019-20
2019–20 Pac-12 Conference men's basketball season
2019 in sports in Arizona
2020 in sports in Arizona